Rock is an unincorporated community in Cowley County, Kansas, United States.  As of the 2020 census, the population of the community and nearby areas was 94.

History

19th century
The post office was established August 12, 1870.

In 1877, the Florence, El Dorado, and Walnut Valley Railroad Company built a branch line from Florence to El Dorado, in 1881 it was extended to Douglass, and later to Arkansas City.  The line was leased and operated by the Atchison, Topeka and Santa Fe Railway.  The line from Florence to El Dorado was abandoned in 1942.  The original branch line connected Florence, Burns, De Graff, El Dorado, Augusta, Douglass, Rock, Akron, Winfield, Arkansas City.

20th century
In 1905, the nearby Bucher Bridge, on the National Register of Historic Places, was built.

On August 24, 1978, the community was evacuated when a major oxidizer spill at a Titan II ICBM site (533-7) 2.5 miles south of Rock.  The spill resulted in the deaths of 2 airmen that were based out of the 381st Strategic Missile Wing, McConnell Air Force Base, approximately 20 miles away.

21st century
In 2010, the Keystone XL Pipeline was constructed about 2.5 miles west of Rock, north to south through Butler County, with much controversy over tax exemption and environmental concerns (if a leak ever occurs).  A pumping station named Rock was built along the pipeline.

Demographics

For statistical purposes, the United States Census Bureau has defined Rock as a census-designated place (CDP).

Education
The community is served by Udall USD 463 public school district.

References

Further reading

External links
 Cowley County maps: Current, Historic, KDOT
 History of Rock, Kansas
 Keystone Oil Pipeline, Detailed system map (near Rock)

Unincorporated communities in Cowley County, Kansas
Unincorporated communities in Kansas